RNLB Mary Stanford (ON 733) was the Ballycotton Lifeboat from 1930 to 1959. Ballycotton is on Ireland's southern coast, a trade route to the Americas. There are many dangerous rocks and shallows with on-shore prevailing winds. Ballycotton has a long tradition of life-saving. Mary Stanford had 41 rescues, or "shouts", and saved 122 lives. She performed the notable Daunt Lightship rescue on 11 February 1936. After her withdrawal from service she lay for some years in a backwater of Dublin's Grand Canal Dock, but has now been returned to Ballycotton and restored.

Ballycotton
The Royal National Lifeboat Institution (RNLI) established a lifeboat station in Ballycotton in 1858. There is a long history of life saving at Ballycotton. The first acknowledged by the Royal National Institution for the Preservation of Life from Shipwreck, as the RNLI was then called, was when they awarded a silver medal in 1826. On 21 December 1825, the vessel Britannia was wrecked in Ballycotton Bay. Her master, the only survivor, lashed himself to a rock. There he remained for seven hours. In spite of the danger, a local man, Dennis Cronen rowed out and rescued him and then sheltered him in his cottage for four days.

There were many early rescues by coastguards.

RNLI

The need for a purpose-built lifeboat was evident. The boat was delivered in time for the visit of the Prince of Wales, Albert Edward in 1858. The lifeboats prior to the Mary Stanford were all powered by oars and sail. As ships became larger the need for a motorised craft was realised. On 12 December 1928, the RMS Celtic was wrecked at Roche's Point, Queenstown (later Cobh). At the time of her launch in 1901, she was the largest ship in her day, one of the "Big Four", the first to exceed 20,000 tons, dwarfing the Ballycotton Lifeboat, which came to the rescue.

The Mary Stanford was named on 7 July 1930 by Mrs. Louisa Cosgrave, wife of President Cosgrave. The cost, £11,000, was covered by a donation from John Frederick Stanford of London. There was a previous lifeboat, named . Two years earlier, it had capsized with the loss of all 17 crew in Rye Harbour, England. The new Mary Stanford would be more fortunate. She would save many lives, including the famous rescue of the Daunt Lightship.

Daunt Lightship Puffin
Daunt Rock has always been a hazard to shipping. The first lightship was stationed there by the Irish Lights Board in 1864 following the wreck of the City of New York on the rock. Lightvessel Puffin took up this duty. There was a severe gale on 8 October 1896 and the Puffin vanished.
The wreck was not found until a month later, on 5 November 1896. The remains of the crew were never located. In folklore they remain at their post, as a ghost ship, appearing to warn of impending danger.

Daunt rescue

On 10 February 1936 a south-eastern gale, with rain and snow, developed into a hurricane. Mountainous waves were crashing over the pier and breakwater transforming the harbour into a seething cauldron, the spray was flying over the lantern of the  lighthouse; "stones, some a ton in weight, were being torn from the quay and flung about like sugar lumps". At 8 am next morning an SOS was received: the LV Comet, on station at Daunt rock, had broken from her moorings and was drifting dangerously. Without waiting for orders, in horrendous conditions, Coxswain Patrick ("Patsy") Sliney took Mary Stanford to sea. Comet was not at Daunt rock, she was riding at anchor a quarter-mile away. Other ships arrived, but dared not approach the Comet in such conditions. Although heavy and built for endurance, the Comet was being tossed around by the waves and was risk to other ships.

Mary Stanford made several attempts to get a steel cable aboard the Comet. Every time they did, a large wave crashed the ships further apart and the cable snapped. When darkness fell, Mary Stanford headed for Cobh to get stronger cables. The  and  stood by. The Lifeboat crew had been all day without food. They ate, slept for three hours and received a change of clothing. Early next morning (Wednesday) Mary Stanford returned to Daunt rock. The sea was just as stormy. It was now enveloped by a thick fog, and it was impossible to effect a rescue. The lifeboat remained in the storm all day and all night. The Commissioners of Irish Lights vessel ILV Isolda had arrived and stood by while Mary Stanford went to Cobh at 7 am to refuel, and promptly returned.

That evening, the storm increased. Comet drifted closer to Daunt rock. When she was 60 yards from the rock, as darkness approached, the Coxswain decided the only option was to try to get alongside and for the crew to jump for the lifeboat. He knew the dangers. On the first attempt, one man got on board, on the second attempt no one jumped; a third time, and five men were safe. The lifeboat went in a fourth and fifth time, but no more were able to make it. Two men were still on board, clinging to the rails, too exhausted to jump. On the sixth attempt, as the Mary Stanford came alongside, the two were seized by the lifeboat crew and dragged aboard. (This moment was depicted on an Irish postage stamp)

They then went to Cobh and disembarked the rescued at 11 pm and then returned to Ballycotton. Mary Stanford had been away for 79 hours.
The crew had only three hours sleep during the 63-hour rescue (from leaving Ballycotton to disembarking Comet's crew at Cobh), they all suffered from colds, saltwater burns and hunger.

An RNLI Gold Medal was awarded to Coxswain Patrick Sliney, Silver Medals to Second Coxswain John Lane Walsh and Motor Mechanic Thomas Sliney, and Bronze Medals to Crew Members Michael Coffey Walsh, John Shea Sliney, William Sliney and Thomas Walsh. This rescue became famous, and was depicted by marine artists. and featured in popular books. When a postage stamp was issued by the Irish Post Office to commemorate the 150th anniversary of the RNLI, this rescue was chosen. The design of the stamp was based on the painting by Bernard Gribble, which depicts the last two lightshipmen being pulled onto the lifeboat.

Other rescues

Mary Stanford had many other rescues to her credit. The years of the Emergency during World War II were difficult. There was a serious risk from drifting mines. On 27 January 1941 a mine exploded on the Ballycotton shore, demolishing the curate's house and smashing the windows in the church.

Rescues which merited RNLI medal were: 
 On 30 January 1941, there was a strong wind, thick fog and drifting mines. The eight-man crew of the SS Primrose of Liverpool were rescued just as she was sinking. A bronze medal was awarded.
 On 23 December 1943, the Irish Ash was in difficulties. This rescue took 30 hours. They managed to bring the ship to safety in Cobh. One silver and two bronze medals were awarded.

Some rescues involved the Cliff Rescue Team. On 1 February 1947, the Irish Plane was driven onto rocks below cliffs, west of Ballyshane. The Mary Stanford did not launch that as little could be done in the weather conditions so close to the shore. The crew of the Irish Plane were rescued by the Cliff Rescue Team.

Epilogue
Mary Stanford retired and on 16 September 1959 and was replaced by Ethel Mary. Lifesaving continues at Ballycotton; there have been many callouts, including during the 1979 Fastnet race. Up to 2002, seventeen RNLI Medals have been awarded to Ballycotton lifeboatmen; two gold, seven silver, and eight bronze. Since March 1998, Ballycotton has been served by Trent Class lifeboat Austin Lidbury.

The Daunt Lightship Comet survived. After she was sold, she became Radio Scotland, a Pirate radio station.

Coxswain Patsy Sliney retired in 1950, he had taken part in the rescue of 114 lives and was awarded Gold, Silver and bronze medals.

Mary Stanford was a reserve lifeboat from 1959 until 1969 when she was sold to the Limerick Harbour Commissioners, where she served as a harbour pilot launch until the mid-1980s. An organisation called the "Irish Nautical Trust" announced plans to establish a floating museum in Grand Canal Dock. They were given a number of historic craft on the understanding that they would be preserved. Without funding the work was abandoned. Subsequently, further boats were refused admission to the dock without assurance that they would be preserved. Mary Stanford lay for some years in Hanover Dock, a backwater of Grand Canal Dock, beside Naomh Éanna which served the Aran Islands.

A group was formed to return Mary Stanford to Ballycotton by April 2014 where, after restoration work, she was put on display.

Effective services

References

Bibliography
 
 

Maritime history of Ireland
1930 ships
Barnett-class lifeboats